30 Days of Night: Red Snow is a prequel to the comic 30 Days of Night.

Collected editions
 30 Days of Night: Red Snow paperback (published January 15, 2008 )

Characters

Lilly
Lilly first appeared in 30 Days of Night unnamed as one of the 19 vampires that attacked Barrow. She was seen in the initial attack and later encountered Eben while she has feeding on a man in the street. She later laughed when Vincente killed Marlowe.
She was the main antagonist in 30 Days of Night: Red Snow, where her name was revealed to be Lilly. She is the sister of Zurial. In the film version, she is played by Abbey-May Wakefield.

Zurial
The vampire brother of Lilly that appeared in 30 Days of Night: Red Snow, and not in the original comic, he was in the film version and was played by John Rawls.

Allied Soldiers

Charlie Keating

A British soldier dispatched to Karelia to advise Soviet troops and ensure that lend lease supplies entering through Murmansk make it to the front. He is shown to be willing to put aside ideological hatreds for the sake of survival, and effectively becomes the group’s defacto leader when the vampires attack. He is wounded while rescuing Nikolai from a vampire, and rather than be turned into a vampire he has Nikolai kill him with a revolver.

Galchenko

A glasses wearing Red Army cavalry commander leading a patrol of Cossacks. He is seen to be a firm communist, and struggles with the situation he is placed in. He is ultimately executed by Hoeppner as the group tries to make its escape and his body is dumped out of the truck they are escaping in hopes of distracting the vampires.

Orlav

A brash Red Army cavalryman from Siberia. Killed by Lilly down in the village’s cellar along with Roza when he goes to inspect the ammunition stores the villagers had managed to conceal.

Nevsky

A Cossack, second in command of the patrol Charlie Keating is assigned to. He is armed with a Shashka(a Cossack cavalry sword) which he uses to kill several vampires in close combat. He approves highly of Keating(saying he thought he would make a good Cossack when Keating demands they turn the truck around to rescue Nikolai). Along with Nikolai, he is one of only two human characters to survive the incident.

Civilians

Stepan

A Russian villager living with his family in a small, isolated, almost abandoned Karelian town. He invites the Red Army patrol to shelter in his home when they arrive. He arranged for the creation of an underground cellar beneath the village in which a large amount of ammunition and supplies were stored. He is killed when the vampires overrun his home’s main floor.

Roza

Stepan’s wife, she helps him take care of the children and hosts the Red Army patrol. Badly shaken after Stepan’s death at the hands of the vampires, she is badly wounded, and Nikolai is forced to kill her before she can become a vampire.

Nikolai

Stepan’s son, he is eager to help the Red Army soldiers fight the Germans. He is traumatized by having to dispatch his own mother when she is badly wounded and turning into a vampire down in the village’s tunnels, and vows to take revenge on both the Germans and the vampires. Ultimately he survives the incident and is last seen in a truck with Nevsky heading back towards Soviet lines.

Vera

Nikolai’s sister, she is only briefly seen in the comic. She is killed by the vampires when they overrun the main floor of Stepan’s house.

Germans

Hoeppner

An SS officer commanding unit of troops from the 6th SS Mountain Division “Nord”. A ruthless and fanatical man, he routinely orders atrocities without hesitating, and treats his own men harshly, and is willing to sacrifice them to the vampires if it provides the slightest advantage. He even hurls Nikolai out of the truck, despite the fact that he is a young boy, in hopes of distracting the vampires. Keating knocks him off the back of the truck following a fist fight, and he winds up surrounded by the horde of vampires. The comic ends with Hoeppner drawing his SS knife and challenging the vampires, with the strong implication that he was killed soon after.

Trabant

A SS soldier armed with an MG-34 machine gun. He is shown to be a firm believer in the Nazi ideology and their war against the USSR, believing that future generations would thank them for what they are doing. However, he is not as sadistic as Hoeppner, and is shocked when his officer executes Russian soldiers who are supposed to help him provide covering fire for the rest of the group. Ultimately, after holding off the vampires for as long as possible, Trabant runs out of ammunition for his MG-34 and kills himself with his pistol rather than allow the vampires to rip him apart.

Klaus Kutcher

A wounded SS soldier with one eye. When the patrol is attacked he is one of the first men overrun by the vampires; it is revealed much later on that he was infected and has transformed into a vampire, attacking the survivors as they attempt to escape; Hoeppner shoots him at point blank range with his Walther P38.

Baum

A glasses wearing SS soldier. He is shown to be a brutal and sadistic man, even by the standards of the SS. Killed by the vampires when the SS men are attacked outside of Nikolai’s village.

Stadler

A SS soldier armed with a flamethrower. He is badly wounded during the break out attempt, and begs Hoeppner to kill him rather than let him turn into a vampire. As the vampires swarm in around him Hoeppner coldly waits until the last possibly second before shooting the flamethrower tank, causing an explosion which kills Stadler and many of the swarming vampires.

Lukas

A SS soldier who is wounded during the fight outside the village and turns into a vampire. Hoeppner kills him when he transforms with an SS dagger.

References

External links
IDW Titles

IDW Publishing titles
Red Snow
Horror comics
Comics set during World War II
2007 comics debuts